Nadezhda Alekhina, née Bazhenova (born 22 September 1978) is a Russian triple jumper.

She finished fourth at the 2002 European Athletics Indoor Championships and won the bronze medal at the 2005 Summer Universiade. She also competed at the World Championships in 2003, 2005 and 2009 without reaching the finals. In the long jump she finished seventh at the 2001 Summer Universiade.

Her personal best jump is 15.14 metres, achieved in July 2009 in Cheboksary. The Russian record is currently held by Tatyana Lebedeva with 15.34 metres. Alekhina also has 6.56 metres in the long jump, achieved in June 2003 in Tula.

International competitions

National titles
Russian Athletics Championships
Triple jump: 2003, 2005, 2009, 2010
Russian Indoor Athletics Championships
Triple jump: 2002

References

1978 births
Living people
Russian female long jumpers
Russian female triple jumpers
Universiade medalists in athletics (track and field)
Universiade bronze medalists for Russia
Medalists at the 2005 Summer Universiade
World Athletics Championships athletes for Russia
Russian Athletics Championships winners